The 1981 All-Ireland Senior Camogie Championship was the high point of the 1981 season. The championship was won by Killkenny who defeated Cork by a five-point margin in a replayed final. The match drew an attendance of 3,000.

Quarter-finals
Surprise of the quarter-final stage was Down's 2–6 to 1–8 victory over Wexford, Marian McGarvey scoring 1-6 of their total. Before their quarter-final with Dublin, Cork dropped three Killeavy players, Pat Moloney, Marian Sweeney and Cathy Landers for playing in a challenge match on the eve of the League final. Dublin led by 4–2 to 1–5 at half time but Cork came storming back to equalise 11 minutes into the second half and win by five points, as Dublin sent over a total of eight wide in the second half and scored just one point. Angela Downey scored 3-4 for Kilkenny against Tipperary, for whom Deirdre Lane scored 1–5.

Semi-finals
Remarkably Galway led  Cork by 1–5 to 1–3 at half time in the All Ireland semi-final before being swept aside by 2–4 in the first ten minutes of the second half. Down appearing in their first semi-final since 1949, never got to grips with Kilkenny and trailed by 2–3 to 0-2 after 13 minutes of their semi-final in Nowlan Park.

Final
Kilkenny got a reprieve in the see-saw final when Cork had led by nine points five minutes into the second half but when Liz Neary snatched a goal from a rebound 25 minutes into the second half they trailed by just a point.  In what was described by the Irish Independent as a truly memorable four-minute period of extra time. Kilkenny fought hard for the equaliser and it was Margaret Farrell who saved the day with a point from play. The five point margin in the replay flattered Kilkenny after Angela Downey scored a breakaway goal in the last movement of the match. Mary O'Leary’s attempt to score an equalising goal from a free a few minutes earlier had been deflected over the bar. Agnes Hourigan wrote in the Irish Press: 
Kilkenny battled back from a seemingly hopeless half time position to earn a draw. The champions seemed to haf the issue clinched in the 54th minute when Mary Geaney set up Mary O’Leary, but from point blank range she missed the proverbial sitter by driving wide. Profiting from that escape, Kilkenny mounted one last assault and Margaret Farrell sent high between the posts for the equalizer. Time was called on the puckout and an exciting, skilful game was over.

Replay
Agnes Hourigan wrote in the Irish Press: 
Medals for bravery should have been awarded to the girls of Kilkenny and Cork as they tirelessly battled for dominance in the replay under the sullen clouds of Croke Park yesterday. In the most atrocious ground conditions, Kilkenny packaged their fourth title and their heroine, Angela Downey, immortalized her name by taking all but three of her side’s scores.

Final stages

Drawn Final September 13: Kilkenny 3-9 Cork 3-9

 
MATCH RULES
50 minutes
Replay if scores level
Maximum of 3 substitutions

Replay October 4: Kilkenny 1-9 Cork 0-7

 
MATCH RULES
50 minutes
Replay if scores level
Maximum of 3 substitutions

See also
 All-Ireland Senior Hurling Championship
 Wikipedia List of Camogie players
 National Camogie League
 Camogie All Stars Awards
 Ashbourne Cup

References

External links
 Camogie Association
 All-Ireland Senior Camogie Championship: Roll of Honour
 Camogie on facebook
 Historical reports of All Ireland finals
 Camogie on GAA Oral History Project

1981 in camogie
1981